Tabeguache Peak is one of the fourteeners of the US state of Colorado. It is a near neighbor of the higher peak Mount Shavano, which lies approximately 1/2 mile (approximately 1 km) to the southeast, and is close to being a subpeak of the latter. According to William Bright an American Linguist specialized in Native American and South Asian languages and descriptive linguistics it is pronounced "TAB-uh-wahch".  According to Mountaineer Louis Dawson the name is pronounced "tab-uh-wash," with the accent on the first syllable.  It lies just east of the Continental Divide and just west of the Arkansas River, in the south-central part of the Sawatch Range.
It is located within the San Isabel National Forest and is in Chaffee County.

The mountain is named for the Tabeguache band of the Utes. "Tabaguache" means 'People of Sun Mountain', from "Tava" meaning 'sun.'

Historical names
Mogwatavungwantsingwu
Mount Tabequache
Tabeguache Mountain
Tageguache Peak – 1982

See also

List of mountain peaks of Colorado
List of Colorado fourteeners

References

External links

 
Mount Shavano at the Colorado Fourteeners Initiative
Mount Shavano on fourteeners.org

Mountains of Colorado
Mountains of Chaffee County, Colorado
Fourteeners of Colorado
North American 4000 m summits